Carnegia may refer to:

 Carnegiea, a cactus genus
 Carnegia (moth), a moth genus
 671 Carnegia, a minor planet